Ministry of Foreign Affairs (Pronounced: Pòrôrāshtro Mōntronàlôy), abbreviated as MOFA, is the Bangladeshi state ministry which oversees foreign relations of Bangladesh.

Fundamental foreign policy of Bangladesh

The State shall base its international relations on the principles of respect for national sovereignty and equality, non-interference in the internal affairs of other countries, peaceful settlements of international disputes, and respect for international law and the principles enunciated in the United Nations Charter, and on the basis of those principles shall;
 Strive for the renunciation of the use of force in international relations and for general and complete disarmament;
 Uphold the right of every people freely to determine and build up its own social, economic and political system by ways and means of its own free choice; and
 Support oppressed peoples throughout the world waging a just struggle against imperialism colonialism or racialism.

See also
 Minister of Foreign Affairs (Bangladesh)

External links
 Ministry of Foreign Affairs

 
Foreign affairs
Foreign relations of Bangladesh
Bangladesh